Puth may refer to:

People 

 Charlie Puth (1991–), American singer, songwriter and record producer
 David Puth, American financial services executive
  (1900–1957), German politician
 Karl Puth (1891–1955), German cinematographer
  (1957–), German caricaturist and illustrator
 Stephen Puth, American singer-songwriter

Places 
 , village in Limburg, Netherlands
, mountain in South Sudan
, hill in Kenya
, castle in South Limburg (Netherlands)